Obioma Nwankwo  predominantly known as Osiskankwu was a Nigerian kidnapper and murderer. He terrorised Abia state from 2008 until he was apprehended by the Joint Military Task Force of the Nigerian army on 12 December 2010.

References 

People executed for murder
Bank robbers
Nigerian gangsters
Nigerian people convicted of murder
People convicted of murder by Nigeria
Executed Nigerian people
People from Abia State
Executed gangsters